Kanna is a feminine Japanese given name.

Possible writings
 栞菜, "bookmark, greens"
 環奈, "circle, Nara"
 寛那, "tolerant, what"
 神奈, "God, Nara"
 神無, "God, nothing"
 栞奈, "bookmark, Nara"
The name can also be written in hiragana or katakana.

People
, guitarist and vocalist from the rock band Bleach03
, Japanese pop singer and former member of Cute
, Japanese mixed martial artist
, Japanese idol singer
Kanna Hayashi (born 1999), assistant professor 
, Japanese fashion model and actress
, Japanese team handball player
, Japanese shogi player

Other people
Kanna Lakshminarayana (born 1955), Indian politician
Kanna Laxminarayana, Indian politician

Fictional characters
, a character in the visual novel Air
Kanna, a character in the television series Avatar: The Last Airbender
, a character in the video game Fire Emblem Fates
, a character in the manga series Inuyasha
 or Lorelei (Pokémon), a character in the Pokémon franchise
, a character in the manga series Shaman King
, a character in the manga series 20th Century Boys
, a character in the manga series Miss Kobayashi's Dragon Maid
, a character in the Sakura Wars franchise
, a character in the anime series Tamako Market
Kanna, a character class of the "Sengoku" type in the video game "MapleStory"
Kanna, an oni from Dead or Alive Xtreme Venus Vacation.
Kanna, a character from Kimi ga Shine -Tasuuketsu Death Game-.

See also
Kana (given name)

Japanese feminine given names